Workman, Clark and Company was a shipbuilding company based in Belfast.

History
The business was established by Frank Workman and George Clark in Belfast in 1879 and incorporated Workman, Clark and Company Limited in 1880. By 1895 it was the UK's fourth largest shipbuilder and by 1900 it was building transatlantic liners for major customers such as Cunard Line and Alfred Holt. It expanded further to meet demand during the First World War and was acquired by Northumberland Shipbuilding Company in 1918. After Northumberland Shipbuilding Company went into receivership in 1927, Workman, Clark and Company was resurrected only to go into receivership itself in 1935.

Frank Workman, then a Belfast city councillor, was a leading figure in the foundation in 1912 of the Young Citizen Volunteers (YCV). From soon after its inception the YCV faced financial problems, and by early 1914 Workman was paying for the upkeep of the group from his own funds.

The Dundonald
In 1891 Workman, Clark and Co launched the Dundonald, a four-masted steel barque measuring 2,205 gross register tons, that would become the subject of one of the south Pacific's major shipwreck stories. In 1907 the Dundonald foundered near Disappointment Island, a small (1.2 sq mi) and uninhabited subantarctic island south of New Zealand. 15 of the crew of 28 survived, living a dreary existence on the cold and inhospitable island, surviving initially by eating raw seabirds. After 7 months they managed to build a small boat from twigs and canvas and made it to the nearby Auckland Island, from where they were later rescued.

References

External links
 

British companies established in 1880
Defunct shipbuilding companies of Northern Ireland
Companies based in Belfast
Engineering companies of Northern Ireland
Manufacturing companies established in 1880
British companies disestablished in 1935